Michigan's State Public School at Coldwater was a model institution at Coldwater, Michigan, for the education and support of dependent and ill-treated children of the state. It was established by an act of the state legislature in 1871, but was not formally opened until 1874. The object of the institution was to receive, care for, educate, and place whenever possible in family homes all the dependent children of Michigan of sound mind and body between the ages of two and twelve. The board of control, however, had the discretionary power vested in it of admitting children under two where circumstances warranted such an exception.

In 1902 there were 155 inmates in the school. The school was located on a farm of 160 acres, covered partly by orchards, ornamental trees, and gardens. The buildings consisted of an administration building, schoolhouse proper, and nine cottages among which the inmates are distributed. This system of cottages, under the superintendence of matrons who were specially qualified for that work, attempted to foster a love for home life. Michigan was first in establishing this type of school. Similar institutions were later established in Iowa, Minnesota, Kansas, Montana, Colorado, Wisconsin, Texas, Nebraska, Alabama, Rhode Island, and Nevada.

In 1935, State Public School was renamed to Michigan Children's Village and began restricting admission to children with mild mental impairments.

The buildings and grounds became part of the Florence Crane Correctional Facility in 1985. The facilities closed in 2011, and in 2019 several buildings were torn down.

References

External links
 

Public schools in Michigan
Michigan State Historic Sites
1871 establishments in Michigan
Educational institutions established in 1871